Tamar Ross (Hebrew: תמר רוס) is a professor of Jewish philosophy at Bar-Ilan University and a specialist of religious feminist philosophy.

Work 
Ross makes a vital contribution to philosophical questions around gender in Judaism by arguing that feminism is not external to Torah but rather integral to it. She argues for the concept of evolving revelation, that is, that people learn more as history evolves and societies develop and mature, and  argues against the concept of Yeridat ha-dorot, the idea that knowledge of Torah diminishes with time. She also argues against approaches of more liberal movements which address perceived flaws by challenging the divinity and religious validity of sacred texts and traditions, arguing that such an approach only undermined the foundations faith. She develops the metaphor of "Expanding the Palace of Torah", originally an idea of Abraham Isaac Kook, for an approach seeking to address contemporary concerns by expanding rather than undermining religious tradition.

Her areas of scholarly expertise include the thought of Abraham Isaac Kook, the modern Musar movement and the ideology of Mitnaggedism, and Judaism and gender. She is the author of books and articles on Jewish ethics and theology, contemporary issues in traditional Jewish thought, philosophy of halakha, and Orthodox Jewish feminism.

Ross is on the Advisory Council of the Jewish Orthodox Feminist Alliance (JOFA).

Ross has published widely on many topics relating to Jewish thought and the philosophy of halakha and was selected by the Israeli government as torchbearer in the Independence Day ceremony of 2013 for her contribution to women's learning.

Ross attended JOFA's conferences over the years.

Selected works
"The Cognitive Value of Religious Truth Claims: Rabbi A.I. Kook and Postmodernism", in Hazon Nahum: Jubilee Volume in Honor of Norman Lamm, December 1997, pp. 479–527.
"Modern Orthodoxy and the Challenge of Feminism", in Studies in Contemporary Jewry, edited by Jonathan Frankel, Eli Lederhendler, Peter Y. Medding and Ezra Mendelsohn. Institute of Contemporary Jewry and Oxford University Press, 2000, pp, 3-38
"Orthodoxy, Women, and Halakhic Change" (Hebrew), in The Quest for Halakha: Interdisciplinary Perspectives on Jewish Law, edited by Amichai Berholz. Yediot Aharonot/Bet Morasha, 2003, pp. 387–438.
Expanding the Palace of Torah: Orthodoxy and Feminism. Brandeis University Press, 2004.

See also
 Jewish feminism
 Jewish Orthodox Feminist Alliance
 Role of women in Judaism

References

Further reading
Yoel Finkelman, "A Critique of Expanding the Palace of Torah: Orthodoxy and Feminism by Tamar Ross". Edah Journal 4:2 2004
Aryeh A. Frimer, Guarding the Treasure. Review of Tamar Ross, Expanding the Palace of Torah: Orthodoxy and Feminism. BDD - Journal of Torah and Scholarship, 18, English section, pp. 67–106 (April 2007).
God subjugates man, and man subjugates his wife. HaAretz, January 11, 2007
Daniel Reifman, "Expanding the Palace of Torah: Orthodoxy and Feminism (review)" Modern Judaism, 26, pp. 101–108 (February 2006)
Claire E. Sufrin, "Telling Stories: The Legal Turn in Jewish Feminist Thought" in Marion Kaplan and Deborah Dash Moore, ed., Gender and Jewish History (Bloomington: Indiana University Press, 2011), pp. 233–250.
 Ephraim Chamiel, Between Religion and Reason - The Dialectic Position in Contemporary Jewish Thought, Academic Studies Press, Boston 2020, part I, pp. 159-167.

External links
Professor Ross Page at Bar Ilan University, Philosophy Department Faculty
Orthodox Israeli Feminists Meet Our American Cousins by Tamar Ross

1938 births
Living people
20th-century Israeli philosophers
21st-century Israeli philosophers
Academic staff of Bar-Ilan University
Israeli ethicists
Feminist theologians
Feminist writers
Israeli feminists
Israeli Orthodox Jews
Israeli women philosophers
Jewish feminists
Judaism and women
Philosophers of Judaism
Jewish ethicists